Sir Graham Robert Watson (born 23 March 1956) is a British Liberal Democrat politician who served as a Member of the European Parliament (MEP) for South West England from 1994 to 2014. Watson was the chairman of the Parliament's committee on citizens rights, justice and home affairs (1999–2002). He then served for seven and a half years as leader of the Liberal Group in the European Parliament, first as leader of the European Liberal Democrat and Reform Party Group (2002–2004) and then as leader of the new Alliance of Liberals and Democrats for Europe Group (2004–2009). From 2011 until 2015 he was the President of the Alliance of Liberals and Democrats for Europe Party. From 2015 to 2020 he was a UK Member on the European Economic and Social Committee. He is currently a Distinguished Visiting Fellow at the University of Toronto's Munk School of Global Affairs and Public Policy and a Visiting Scholar at Symbiosis University’s School of International Studies in Pune.

Early life
Graham Watson was born in Rothesay on the Isle of Bute (Scotland, United Kingdom), the eldest of six children. His father was an officer in the Royal Navy and his mother a teacher. Watson was educated at the City of Bath Boys' School following his father’s posting to the Admiralty in Bath. He returned to Scotland to attend Heriot-Watt University in Edinburgh where he graduated in 1979 with a Bachelor of Arts in modern languages. He worked first as a freelance interpreter and translator and then (1980–83) as an administrator at Paisley College of Technology. He now speaks four European languages.

Watson began his political activity in the National League of Young Liberals in 1972. As international officer of the Scottish Young Liberals he became involved in the International Federation of Liberal Youth, becoming a vice-president (1977) then General Secretary (1979) of the organisation. He was a founder of the European Communities' Youth Forum. He served as a council member of the European Liberal Democrat and Reform Party between 1983 and 1993. Between 1983 and 1987 he also served as head of the private office of then leader of the British Liberal Party, Sir David Steel.

In 1988 he began work for the bank HSBC in London and Hong Kong. His time there encompassed three months with the European Bank for Reconstruction and Development and gave him an interest in the Far East. He has travelled widely in the region and speaks some Mandarin Chinese.

European Parliament

In the 1994 European Parliamentary election he was elected for Somerset and North Devon with a majority of over 22,500. Watson  was the first Liberal Democrat returned from a British constituency to serve in the European Parliament. Accompanied by Robin Teverson, elected later the same night, he sat with the Group of the European Liberal Democrat and Reform Party (ELDR). During this term, Watson served on two committees; the Committee on Economic and Monetary Affairs and Industrial Policy and the Committee on Budgets, and acted as whip for the ELDR group until 1996.

Second term
In 1999 the introduction of the list system (a form of proportional representation) in Great Britain for European elections meant Watson's constituency was abolished in favour of a larger multi-member constituency encompassing South West England. The South West constituency would later also include Gibraltar, from 2004. Watson was re-elected in this constituency as the sole Liberal Democrat member at the 1999 European Parliamentary election. His party had gained 171,398 votes, 15.7% of the total. During this term he led the ten British Liberal Democrats in the parliament and between 1999 and 2002 he held the chair of the Committee on Citizens' Freedoms and Rights, Justice and Home Affairs. In that position he steered through Parliament freedom of information provisions and the legislation providing for a European Arrest Warrant. In 2002 he was elected to lead the EU-wide ELDR Group, succeeding Irishman Pat Cox MEP.

Third term

Watson was re-elected once more at the 2004 European Parliamentary election with his party winning 265,619 votes (18.3%).

Following the election, Watson was re-elected to lead the ELDR Group and took it into an alliance with Romano Prodi’s newly-formed European Democratic Party to form the Alliance of Liberals and Democrats for Europe. The ALDE group replaced the ELDR group (though ELDR and EDP existed for a while as separate parties outside the Parliament). Watson was elected leader of the new ALDE group, which was the largest group ever established in the Parliament outside of the European People's Party and Party of European Socialists.

Fourth term
Watson was elected to a fourth term as an MEP for the South West in the European Parliament elections of June 2009, with the Liberal Democrats winning 266,253 votes (17.07%). Following the election, Watson stood down from the leadership of the ALDE Group, having served in that role for longer than any of his predecessors. He sat on the European Parliament's foreign affairs committee and served as Chairman of Parliament's Delegation for relations with India. He also chaired a global network of legislators campaigning for a switch from fossil fuels to renewable energy known as The Climate Parliament, of which he had been a founder member in the late 1990s.

2014 European elections
Watson lost his seat at the European Parliament in the elections of May 2014, despite having polled 10.7% of the vote, the largest vote share of any UK Liberal Democrat in the 2014 EP election. He established a global advocacy practice, Bagehot Limited, which he ran until reaching retirement age in 2021.

In 2015 Watson was appointed by the UK Government to sit on the European Economic and Social Committee, an advisory body with a five-year mandate. He sat on the Transport and Energy section and on the Foreign Affairs section and from 2015 to 2017 was chairman of the EESC's China Contact Group.

Other activities and family
Watson lived in Langport, Somerset, from 1994 to 2017. He now lives in Edinburgh and in Brussels. His wife is from Italy and their children, one daughter and one son, were born in 1992 and 1995 respectively. Watson enjoys sailing, cycling, choir singing and music. He indulges in the restoration of Art Nouveau houses and classic wooden yachts.

Watson was knighted in the 2011 Birthday Honours for political and public service. He is also the recipient of honours from the Republic of China (Taiwan), Georgia and Gibraltar.

In 2021 he was elected to the Board of the European Cyclists' Federation and in November 2022 was elected Chairman of the World Cycling Alliance.

Watson is a supporter of the Campaign for the Establishment of a United Nations Parliamentary Assembly, an organisation which advocates democratic reform of the United Nations.

Bibliography
 Watson, Graham, Andrew Burgess (2014). Continental Drift. Bagehot Publishing. 
 Watson, Graham, Andrew Burgess (2012). Letters from Europe. Bagehot Publishing.|

References

External links

Graham Watson MEP, official site
MEP Profile of Graham Watson, European Parliament
Biographical details: Graham Watson MEP, ALDE
Graham Watson Profile, UK Liberal Democrats

|-

|-

1956 births
Living people
Alumni of Heriot-Watt University
British republicans
HSBC people
Knights Bachelor
Liberal Democrats (UK) MEPs
MEPs for England 1994–1999
MEPs for England 1999–2004
MEPs for England 2004–2009
MEPs for England 2009–2014
People educated at City of Bath Boys' School
People from Langport
People from Rothesay, Bute
Politicians awarded knighthoods
Scuderia Toro Rosso